Mazhuvannur Maha Siva Kshethram is an ancient Hindu Temple at Tharuvana in Wayanad district of the Indian state of Kerala. The presiding deity is Lord Shiva; other deities are Arayil Bhagavathy, Shree Durga, Nandhi, Lord Ayyappa and Lord Ganapathi. This temple is situated on the highest peak in the areas of Karingari, Paliyana, and Tharuvana. Daily poojas (prayers) were performed there from ancient times. Mazhuvannur Thekke Illam family members have been involved in leading pooja for many centuries.

Legends
It is believed that the name Mazhuvannur is derived from the Malayalam words "Mazhu" (Axe), "Vanna" (Come), "Oor" (Place), which means "the place where axe had fallen".

Legend speaks of Lord Shiva appearing to Banasura after his arduous tapas (meditation) and offering him a wish. Banasura used this to ask Lord Shiva to guard his Kingdom. Lord Sbiva and Parvathi guarded his castle (Banasura Kotta). Meanwhile, Banasura's daughter Usha was affectionate towards Anirudhan, son of Lord Krishna. One day Anirudhan came to Banasura Kotta to meet Usha. This led to a fight between Anirudhan and Banasur that ended with Anirudhan;s capture and sentencing. Lord Krishna, in order to free his son, started a war with Banasur. Because Lord Shiva was a guardian to Banasur, he was forced to fight Lord Krishna. Lord Shiva used his weapon (Sivajwaram) and Lord Krishna resisted with his weapon (Vishnujwaram). Neither was able to claim victory. This led to Lord Shiva throwing his axe against Lord Krishna from the Banasura hills. The axe was believed to have fallen in Mazhuvannur at the location of the temple and Parasurama is believed to have built the temple at this spot.

Functions and activities 
Daily pooja has been carried out in this temple from ancient times. During festival times like Onam, Vishu, Aaayudha Pooja, etc., special poojas are carried out. During Sabarimala season daily evening pooja is carried out. These functions are widely attended by many people from around the country. During Sabarimala season Bhajana (singing prayer) and special prayers are carried out. Recently the temple committee has started giving "Annadanam" on the first Sunday of each month as a form of offering food to monks and other people.

Renovation 

The temple, which was built with bricks and wood in ancient times, was renovated recently. The temple had "Naalu Kettu" in very ancient times, but only its remains are still visible there. Presently the temple is under Malabar Dewaswom Board. They planted trees in temple land and made a signpost among other upgrades.

Design 
The main temple complex is a Lord Ayyappan tree-based structure. A pond and surrounding land are known as Banglow Kunnu, Naaga Kaav, temple land and idol at Puthusseri.

Landscape 
Banasura Hills are near this temple. Banasura Sagar Dam, one of the biggest earth dams in Asia is nearby.

Gallery

References

See also
 Temples of Kerala
 Wayanad
 Mananthavady

Hindu temples in Wayanad district
Shiva temples in Kerala
Padinharethara area